St Joseph's College was a Roman Catholic minor seminary in Mark Cross, outside Rotherfield in East Sussex. It was designed by Edward Pugin and the site dates to 1869. It is a Grade II listed building. It has been named by the Victorian Society as a heritage building at risk of disrepair.

St. Michael's Orphanage for Girls
It was originally known as St. Michael's Orphanage for Girls and was built in 1869. The exterior was designed by George Goldie and the interior was designed by E. W. Pugin. It was paid for by a donation from the Duchess of Leeds, wife of Francis D'Arcy-Osborne, 7th Duke of Leeds. The site itself consisted of 54 acres of land and it was run by the Society of the Holy Child Jesus as part of a pair of orphanages, the other one being Mayfield College. In 1903, it was extended to allow for more accommodation in the convent, the extension was designed by Joseph Hansom.

St Joseph's College
In 1925, it was bought by the Archdiocese of Southwark to serve as a minor seminary for St John's Seminary in Wonersh. In 1960, the building was extended to allow for six extra classrooms.

Post-seminary

Legat's School of Ballet
In 1970, it was closed and was bought by a group and it became the Legat's School of Ballet, founded by Nadine Nicolaeva-Legat.

Jameah Islameah School

In 1992, it was bought by a charity called Jameah Islameah. In 2006,  it was raided by Metropolitan Police who believed it was being used as a training camp for terrorists. In 2007, it was closed by the Department for Education and Skills for failing standards. It did not have any pupils at the time.

See also
 St John's Seminary, Wonersh

References

Mark Cross
Mark Cross
Mark Cross
Rotherfield